The Pennsylvania State Capitol Complex is a large complex of state government buildings in Harrisburg, Pennsylvania. It is bounded on the north by Forster Street, the east by North 7th Street, the south by Walnut Street, and the west by North 3rd Street. Most of this area (bounded on the north by North Street) is a National Historic Landmark District, recognized in 2013 as a fully realized example of the City Beautiful movement landscape and planning design of Arnold Brunner.

Description
The Pennsylvania State Capitol Complex is located in central downtown Harrisburg, four blocks east of the Susquehanna River.  Its centerpiece is the Pennsylvania State Capitol, constructed in 1902 - 1906 to a design by Joseph Miller Huston.  The capitol is a nationally recognized example of Beaux Arts architecture, and is known for its interior opulence and artwork.  On the east side of the capitol is the East Wing, a 1987 extension that greatly expands the building's capacity without detracting from the surrounding landscape.  Flanking the East Wing to the north and south are the North and South Office Buildings, begun in 1927 and 1919 respectively; they are similarly scaled and both built of Indiana limestone in the Classical Revival style, but have slightly different styling.  South of the Capitol is the Ryan Office Building, the oldest building (completed 1894) of the complex.  Between the two buildings a semicircular walkway provides access to them as well as the East Wing entrance to the Capitol, with a fountain in the center.

Across Commonwealth Avenue east of the North and South Office Buildings, a pair of buildings extend the line of the North and South Buildings, with the Soldiers' and Sailors' Memorial Grove, a park setting with many memorials and monuments in between. On the south side of the grove is the Forum, and the Finance Building is to the north.  Both continue the use of Indiana limestone and Classical Revival styling.  The easternmost portion of the complex is the Soldiers' and Sailor's Bridge, which connects the complex to neighborhoods across the railroad tracks that run east of North 7th Street.

The complex has been extended across North Street to include the Modernist State Museum of Pennsylvania building and the adjacent Department of Transportation building.

The complex and greater area is protected full-time by the Pennsylvania Capitol Police—its dedicated law enforcement agency—as well as the Harrisburg Bureau of Police, which patrols the entire city.

Monuments 
A Gathering at the Crossroads is a monument on the southern end of the complex near the corner of North Fourth Street and Walnut Street. It commemorates the 100 and 150-year anniversaries of the passing of the Fifteenth Amendment and Nineteenth Amendment.

Buildings

Development history
Harrisburg's Capitol Hill has been the seat of Pennsylvania state government since 1822, when its first capitol building was dedicated.  That structure, much altered over the 19th century.  In 1893 work began on what is now the Ryan Office Building.  The first capitol burned down in 1897, and its replacement was abandoned in an unfinished state in 1899 after negative public and legislative response to its exterior.  The present capitol was begun in 1902 and completed in 1906.

In the 1910s the state recognized the need for additional space, and acquired the area then known as the Eighth Ward, between Commonwealth Avenue and North 7th Street.  Arnold Brunner was selected to develop a master landscaping and design plan for this space, which he did using then-fashionable City Beautiful principles.  Although only small portions of his vision were realized in his lifetime (he died in 1925), the resulting landscape is very much in keeping with his original plans.  The principal deviation is the area now occupied by the East Wing.  Brunner had planned this as a "People's Forecourt", an open space whose landscaping would tie the Capitol and the North and South Buildings together visually.  In execution, the area became a parking lot serving the capitol until the East Wing was built, providing a different and more modern type of visual unity.

The Capitol building was listed on the National Register of Historic Places in 1977, and was designated a National Historic Landmark in 2006.  The latter designation was expanded to include the entire area of the complex south of North Street in 2013.

See also
List of National Historic Landmarks in Pennsylvania
National Register of Historic Places listings in Dauphin County, Pennsylvania
 List of state and county courthouses in Pennsylvania

References

City of Harrisburg - Capitol Complex overview
emporis.com: Capitol Complex profile
skyscraperpage.com: Harrisburg, Pennsylvania profile
 

 
Government buildings on the National Register of Historic Places in Pennsylvania
Historic districts on the National Register of Historic Places in Pennsylvania
National Register of Historic Places in Dauphin County, Pennsylvania
Renaissance Revival architecture in Pennsylvania
Neoclassical architecture in Pennsylvania
Harrisburg, Pennsylvania